Ghazi Albuliwi is best known for his 2013 film Peace After Marriage, a film in which he wrote, acted in, and directed. He also worked on the film West Bank Brooklyn

Early life 
Ghazi Albuliwi was born in Jordan and moved to Brooklyn as an infant. His mother is from a village near Haifa, Israel. Although he believes his family fled in 1948. He spoke Arabic at home, but had a diverse set of friends, notably Latino, African-American, and Italian children. He started doing stand up comedy when he was 17.

Peace after Marriage 
Ghazi Albulwi was inspired to make this film while sitting at a cafe in Jerusalem trying to make a comedy. Then when he saw a group of Israelis laughing he was inspired to make something they would laugh at and change any prior notions of someone who happens to be Arab. Ghazi has stated in an interview for the Huffington Post, "Call me idealistic but at the moment, sitting near these Israelis I said to myself: "Write a movie where they would laugh and forget you were Arab."

The film Peace After Marriage had its world premier at the 2013 Abu Dhabi Film Festival. The film is about a Muslim Palestinian-American man in New York who marries an Israeli Jewish woman, who is desperate for a Green Card. On November 30 it was featured in the Jerusalem Jewish Film Festival.

According to The New York Times, Peace After Marriage, "a $1 million Turkish-French-American production that has picked up several festival awards, is something different." Titled “Only in New "York” in Europe.

Peace after Marriage won the award "Best Script" in 2010 when it went through the Tribecca All Access program through the Tribecca Film Institute. Additional funding came post-production where Good Lap Production helped to complete the picture as well as the music score.

Hiam Abbass played the role of Albulwi's mother in the film.

Ghazi Albulwi was a finalist for the Nicholl Fellowship award given by the Academy of Motion Picture Arts and Sciences. Ghazi Albulwi was a finalist for his role as Arafat.

General Themes 
Ghazi Albulwi is known for using themes relating to non-belonging. Common uses of this are in his works that make use of cultural and ethnicity differences. Ghazi credits his work with the notion that he wants to change one opinion one culture has of someone from another culture.

Ghazi Albulwi believes that laughter and subsequently humor does not have any boundary, whether it is a territory, religion, or barrier of other sorts.

Ghazi Albulwi, as an Arab-American knows what it has felt like to be a part of a culture and religion where there is current conflict and wants to help change the way people feel about the religion and culture so that those who are among that culture do not need to feel "pain of living through it" 

When questioned about a solution for the situation where the cultures clash with one another Ghazi Albuwi stated, "Sexual jihad: one big orgy with the Arabs and the Jews, where we release all our hostilities, and I hope I’m right in the middle of it.” Although after this use of humor in Abu Dhabi, a journalist ended up canceling interviews. Albuwi wants to promote a place where culture and religion is not as important and people can get along without having these prior notions and potential hostilities. Albuwi wants his work to have both people of Jewish culture and Arab culture in a room together where they can just laugh. Something that is funny does not need to have politics, religion, and culture behind it. Because of this, he does not want a film where the viewer is thinking about past wars as well as the violence between the two religions. For him, art has the power to make a person question how they feel in subtle yet powerful way.

References 

American male film actors
American male screenwriters
American film directors
Living people
Jordanian emigrants to the United States
Year of birth missing (living people)